The 2010 Canoe Sprint European Championships were held in the Trasona Reservoir, Trasona, Spain.

Medal overview

Men

Women

Handikayak (Para Canoe)

Medal table

References

External links
 European Canoe Association

Canoe Sprint European Championships
2010 in Spanish sport
2010 in canoeing
Canoeing and kayaking competitions in Spain